Komagfjord Church is a parish church of the Church of Norway in Alta Municipality in Troms og Finnmark county, Norway. It is located in the village of Komagfjord. It is one of the churches for the Talvik parish which is part of the Alta prosti (deanery) in the Diocese of Nord-Hålogaland. The brown, wooden church was built in a cruciform style in 1960 using plans drawn up by the architects Turid and Kristen Bernhoff Evensen. The church seats about 250 people.

History
The first church at Komagfjord was consecrated on 15 September 1887. It was a white church that was designed by the architect Jacob Wilhelm Nordan. The church was slightly up on the hill above the shop and pier. The church, along with many buildings in Finnmark county, was burned down by German soldiers as the fled the country in 1944, near the end of World War II.

Shortly after the war, a temporary building was constructed to replace the church. The new church was built a short distance away from the previous site because more room was needed for a cemetery and the previous site was unsafe due to past landslides. The new building was consecrated on 16 February 1947 by Bishop Wollert Krohn-Hansen. That temporary building was used for 13 years before a new church was finally built in 1960. The new permanent church was consecrated on 10 April 1960. In 1989-1990, the roof was redone with new slate.

See also
List of churches in Nord-Hålogaland.

References

Alta, Norway
Churches in Finnmark
Wooden churches in Norway
Cruciform churches in Norway
20th-century Church of Norway church buildings
Churches completed in 1960
1887 establishments in Norway